Lilyan Chauvin (6 August 192526 June 2008) was a French-American actress, television host, director, writer, and acting teacher. A native of Paris, Chauvin began her career performing on French radio and onstage in England. She relocated to the United States in 1952 to pursue an acting career, and was initially cast in minor television parts before making her film debut in 1957.

Chauvin's career in American films spanned over 60 years, and largely consisted of supporting roles. Some of her credits include The Other Side of Midnight (1977), Private Benjamin (1980), the slasher film Silent Night, Deadly Night (1984), Predator 2 (1990), and Steven Spielberg's Catch Me If You Can (2002). She also had a prolific career in television, and guest-starred in such television series as The X-Files, Murder, She Wrote, Star Trek: Deep Space Nine, Friends, Magnum, P.I., Alias, Malcolm in the Middle, The Man from U.N.C.L.E., McCloud, Perry Mason, and Ugly Betty.

In her later life, Chauvin taught acting and directing at the University of California, Los Angeles and the University of Southern California. She also served as the Vice President of Women in Film council. She died in Los Angeles in 2008 of complications resulting from congestive heart failure and breast cancer, the latter of which she battled for four decades.

Early life
Chauvin was born in Paris, Île-de-France, France, to a French mother, Emilia Speltiens, and an Italian father, Pantion Pierre Zemoz.

Chauvin began her career working in broadcasting in France. While under contract to a French radio station she had her heart set on becoming a lawyer; however her earnings soon exceeded that of her parents' and she gave serious consideration to making show business her way of life. She studied in Paris at the School of Cinema,  and at the Jean-Louis Barrault School, also in Paris.

Career

Early career and stage
Chauvin moved to New York City in 1952 and became a naturalized American citizen. She studied with Uta Hagen and at the Actors Studio in New York. Chauvin also attended the Berlitz school of Languages and took in American movies every day to improve her English. Already proficient in Spanish, German, Italian, and Russian, she soon became one of the school's top teachers and they sent her out to coach actors in the accents they needed for various roles.

Chauvin's European stage and Actors Equity theatre credits include Macbeth, Medea, Silk Stockings, Camille, and Three for Today. She began landing roles in New York television productions including TV's prestigious Studio One. Soon after she traveled to Los Angeles and found work in film and television.

Transition to film
Chauvin made her film acting debut in Letter from Cairo (1953), an episode of the long-running series Studio One. The following year she guest-starred in Crusader. Chauvin made her first motion picture appearance in Lost, Lonely and Vicious (1958) and later starred in Walk Like a Dragon (1960) and Bloodlust! (1961). She also appeared in the Elvis Presley films King Creole (1958) and Tickle Me (1965) and the Barbra Streisand film Funny Lady (1975). Other film credits include Yours, Mine and Ours (1968), The Mephisto Waltz (1971), The Other Side of Midnight (1977), Beyond Reason (1977), Private Benjamin (1980), Silent Night, Deadly Night (1984, as the sadistic Mother Superior), Born in East L.A. (1987), Bad Influence (1990), Predator 2 (1990), Angel Town (1990), Universal Soldier (1992), The Warlord: Battle for the Galaxy (1998), Five Aces (1999), The Man Who Wasn't There (2001) and Catch Me If You Can (2002).

Chauvin was a series regular on Days of Our Lives, Mission Impossible, General Hospital and Falcon Crest. Other television credits include “Jim Bowie’’ Adventures of Superman, Combat!, Baa Baa Black Sheep, Friends,  ER, Star Trek: Deep Space Nine, Tyson, Malcolm in the Middle, Alias, CSI, Ugly Betty, The X-Files, and Murder She Wrote.

Directing
In the industry, Chauvin's talents are respected equally as a director and actress. Her DGA directing credits include The Young and the Restless,
But She Can Type, Celebration 75 and Windows of Heaven. Chauvin directed productions of Last Summer at Bluefish Cove, Effigies, Seacliffe California, In My Minds Eye, The Happy Time and The Deepest Hunger.

Other ventures

Teaching
In her later life, Chauvin became a prominent acting and directing coach in Los Angeles, teaching at the University of California, Los Angeles and the University of Southern California. Many of her techniques have become instrumental teaching tools within the industry and have provided inspiration to many other successful educators. As an author and educator she taught internationally at seminars as a keynote speaker, lecturer and adviser.

As the creator and show runner she co-produced and hosted the television series Hollywood Structured,  a comprehensive guide to show business careers, Chauvin explored new facets of the industry each week through interviews with top professionals. The 64 episodes covered acting, directing, make up, documentary filmmaking, producing, music, comedy, cinematography, stunt coordinating, modeling, publicity, writing, dancing, sports announcing, production design, entertainment law, agency, casting, union, special effects and more.

Chauvin wrote Hollywood Scams & Survival Tactics, in which she shared many of her own experiences and survival tactics.

She taught acting, multi-cam cinematography and directing for over 10 years at USC and taught acting/directing at UCLA for two years. Some of Chauvin's acting students were Raquel Welch, Suzanne Somers, Margie Haber, Carly Schroeder, Kin and Wil Shriner, Jennifer Runyon, Kevin Nealon and Rex Steven Sikes. She was a technical advisor and dialogue coach at MGM and worked as a dialogue supervisor/drama coach at Warner Brothers. For many years she ran the Women in Film Director's Workshop which drew large numbers of people from the various aspects of filmmaking.

Still photography
Chauvin's work with stationary images included taking a photograph of author William Faulkner that was published in The Atlantic Monthly magazine and was to be used on dust jackets of Faulkner books.

Accolades
Twice nominated for Emmy Awards (for The Young and the Restless and Baa Baa Black Sheep), Chauvin won the 1991 Angel Award for Hollywood Structured, which was co-produced by Chauvin, Julie Johnson and Irene Lamothe. Chauvin appeared weekly as the host on this cable program with, among others,
Jacqueline Bisset, Linda Gray, Morey Amsterdam, Danny Glover, Henry Mancini, Anne Francis, Carmen Zapata and others.

Affiliations
Chauvin was on the Women's Steering Committee of the Directors Guild of America and had over 35 credits as a DGA Director since 1979. She was a member of Screen Actors Guild, the Writers Guild of America, the American Federation of Television and Radio Artist and Equity. Committed to furthering women's causes, especially in the industry, Chauvin was a 39-year member of Women in Film. She served on the organization's Board five times, twice as the Board's vice president.

Personal life
Chauvin was married to Bernard Chauvin, whom she divorced in Florida in 1953. She retained his surname for the remainder of her career. In the 1960s, Chauvin was diagnosed with breast cancer, which she would battle intermittently for the following four decades.

Death
Chauvin died at her Studio City, Los Angeles home on 26 June 2008, aged 82. Her death was attributed to complications from breast cancer and congestive heart disease.

Filmography

Film

Television

Video games

Notes

References

External links

 

1925 births
2008 deaths
American film actresses
American television actresses
American television directors
Deaths from cancer in California
Deaths from breast cancer
American women television directors
French film actresses
French emigrants to the United States
French stage actresses
French television actresses
Actresses from Paris
People from Studio City, Los Angeles
French people of Italian descent
American people of Italian descent
20th-century American actresses
20th-century French women
21st-century American women